This is an alphabetical list of companies that have at one-point or another been based in Ottawa:
 Abacus Data
 Alterna Savings
Atkinson Film-Arts
 Bank of Ottawa
 Bell-Northern Research
 BreconRidge
 Bridgewater Systems
 Brookstreet Pictures
 Bruised Tongue
 Campeau Corporation
 Canada Deposit Insurance Corporation
 Canada Mortgage and Housing Corporation
 Canada Post
 Canadian Bank Note Company
 Canadian Broadcasting Corporation
 Canadian Commercial Corporation
 Ciel Satellite Group
 Cognos
 Corel
 CPAC (TV channel)
 CPCS Transcom Limited
 Defence Construction Canada
 Doyle Salewski Inc
 DragonWave
 Ekos Research Associates
 ENCON Group Inc.
 Epiphan Systems
 Eurocom Corporation
 Export Development Canada
 Farm Boy
 First Air
 Freimans
 Fuel Industries
 Funbag Animation Studios
 Gabriel Pizza
 Gandalf Technologies
 Giant Tiger
 Granite Ottawa
 Halogen Software
 Hydro Ottawa
 Ingenia Communications Corporation
 International Development Research Centre
 Iogen Corporation
 Kelp Records
 Klipfolio
 Knight Enterprises
 Kongsberg Gallium Ltd.
 KRP Properties
 Lacewood Productions
 Lee Valley Tools
 Level Platforms
 Loeb (supermarket)
 Lumenera
 Magma Communications
 Market Fresh
 Marshes Golf Club
 MediaMiser
 Mercury Filmworks
 MicroSystems International
 Minto Group
 Mitel
 MKC Networks
 NABU Network
 Neptec Design Group
 Newbridge Networks
 Nordion
 Le Nordir
 Ogilvy's
 Ottawa Car Company
 Ottawa Central Railway
 Ottawa Central Railway
 Ottawa Dumpster
 Ottawa Home Pros
 Ottawa Renovation Pro Ltd.
 PlaSmart
 Pleora
 Pronexus
 ProntoForms
 Protecode
 Protus
 Public Sector Pension Investment Board
 Pure Spring Company
 QNX Software Systems
 Quickie Convenience Stores
 Red Quill Books
 SAW Video Mediatheque
 Shopify
 Siemens Healthineers
 Signority
 Skycron
 Solace
 Solidum Systems
 Spiderwort
 Tablo (DVR)
 Telesat
 Ten Broadcasting
 Tundra Semiconductor
 Versaterm
 Wilderness Tours
 Zarlink

Ottawa
Companies